The Mid-Ulster Cup is a senior football competition in Northern Ireland run by the Mid-Ulster Football Association (founded 2 April 1887). The competition has historically featured teams based in County Armagh, east County Tyrone, and west County Down, though teams from outside the Mid-Ulster FA's jurisdiction have also competed on occasion, with Bangor (affiliated to the County Antrim & District F.A.) winning the cup in 1995/96. 

First held in 1887/88, the inaugural edition was won by Milford. For 30 seasons, from 1947/48 to 1977/78, while remaining a senior competition, senior clubs declined to take part, instead fielding their reserve teams. Senior clubs returned, however, for the 1978/79 season, when the Bob Radcliffe Cup was introduced as an intermediate competition.

The competition is currently sponsored by EuroElectrix, and has been sponsored in the past by Golden Cow Dairies, Dukes Transport, Tennent's Lager, Bass, Ted Clarke, McEwan's Lager, Silverwood Hotel, Rushmere Shopping Centre and Belfast Telegraph.

Winners and finals

Winners 1888-1978
Incomplete list of winners

Finals since 1978

Performance by club

See also
County Antrim Shield

North West Senior Cup

Bob Radcliffe Cup

References

5